Frontenac was a federal electoral district represented in the House of Commons of Canada from 1867 to 1925. It was located in the province of Ontario. It was created by the British North America Act of 1867.

It was initially defined to consist of the Townships of Kingston, Wolfe Island, Pittsburg and Howe Island, and Storrington.

In 1903, the riding was redefined to consist of the county of Frontenac, excluding the city of Kingston and the village of Portsmouth.

The electoral district was abolished in 1924 when it was merged into Frontenac—Addington riding.

Election results

On Mr. Kirkpatrick's death, 26 March 1870:

|}

|}

|}

|}

|}

|}

|}

On Mr. Kirkpatrick being named Lieutenant-Governor of Ontario, 1 June 1892:

|}

|}

|}

|}

|}

|}

|}

|}

See also 
 List of Canadian federal electoral districts
 Past Canadian electoral districts

References

External links 
Riding history from the Library of Parliament

Former federal electoral districts of Ontario